Morris Molinari (born 4 April 1975) is a former Italian football defender.

Career 
During his football career, Molinari, he donned the jersey of many football clubs like Monza, Triestina, Juve Stabia in Serie B, while in the inferior leagues he donned the jersey of Ascoli, Reggiana, Frosinone, Virtus Lanciano, Gallipoli, etc. In total, between 1995 and 2012, he played 360 football games, including 45 in Serie B.

In the 2012–2013 and 2013–2014 seasons he played with Salernitana after finishing his contract with Juve Stabia. In 2014, he has retired from professional football.

Honours and awards
Serie C1 promotion: 2005–06 (Frosinone)
Lega Pro Prima Divisione promotion: 2008–09 (Gallipoli)
Supercoppa di Lega di Prima Divisione winner: 2008–09 (Gallipoli)
Lega Pro Prima Divisione promotion: 2010–11 (Juve Stabia)
Coppa Italia Lega Pro winner: 2010–11 (Juve Stabia)
Lega Pro Seconda Divisione promotion: 2012–13 (Salernitana)

References 

1975 births
Living people
Italian footballers
Association football defenders
Ascoli Calcio 1898 F.C. players
A.C. Reggiana 1919 players
S.S. Juve Stabia players
Frosinone Calcio players
U.S. Salernitana 1919 players